Trafalgar is a town in Nineveh and Hensley townships, Johnson County, Indiana, United States. The population was 1,101 at the 2010 census.

It is the home of the transmitters for WTTV, WTTS, WSOM and WHZN.

History
Col. Avery M. Buckner is credited for platting a town, in the early 1850s, along a short-lived flat bar railroad that ran between Franklin, and Martinsville. First named Liberty, the name was changed to Trafalgar. Soon Ezekiel W. Morgan came to town to open a store. Denied a site near the railroad, he bought land in a nearby village founded by George Bridges.
   
In 1868, the railroad was rebuilt as the Fairland and Martinsville branch of the Big Four. The post office (and town name) was moved to Morgan's store. By 1870, the “old” and “new” Trafalgars had grown together and were briefly incorporated as one. The current town of Trafalgar was reincorporated in 1946. By the 90s, the town had grown 266%. The name of the town commemorates the Battle of Trafalgar.

Geography
Trafalgar is located at  (39.414126, -86.153291).

Education
It is within the Nineveh-Hensley-Jackson United School Corporation. Trafalgar is home to Indian Creek Senior High School, one of seven high schools located in Johnson County. It is also home to Indian Creek Middle School and Indian Creek Elementary School.

Trafalgar has a public library, a branch of the Johnson County Public Library.

Demographics

2010 census
As of the 2010 census, the town had 1,101 people that comprised 385 households and 292 families. The racial makeup of the town was 96.3% White, 0.9% African American, 0.9% Native American, 0.5% Asian, 0.3% from other races, and 1.1% from two or more races. Hispanic or Latino people of any race were 1.0% of the population.

Of the 385 households 46.8% had children under the age of 18 living with them, 54.3% were married couples living together, 14.8% had a female householder with no husband present, 6.8% had a male householder with no wife present, and 24.2% were non-families. 20.0% of households were one person and 6.5% were one person aged 65 or older. The average household size was 2.83 and the average family size was 3.24.

The median age in the town was 34.2 years. 30.2% of residents were under the age of 18; 9.2% were between the ages of 18 and 24; 28.8% were from 25 to 44; 23.5% were from 45 to 64; and 8.2% were 65 or older. The gender makeup of the town was 49.3% male and 50.7% female.

2000 census
At the 2000 census there were 798 people, 263 households, and 208 families in the town. The racial makeup of the town was 98.75% White, 0.63% Native American, 0.50% Asian, and 0.13% from two or more races. Hispanic or Latino people of any race were 0.88%.

Of the 263 households 52.1% had children under the age of 18 living with them, 63.9% were married couples living together, 11.8% had a female householder with no husband present, and 20.9% were non-families. 18.3% of households were one person and 5.7% were one person aged 65 or older. The average household size was 2.99 and the average family size was 3.39.

The age distribution was 35.2% under the age of 18, 7.1% from 18 to 24, 36.3% from 25 to 44, 12.9% from 45 to 64, and 8.4% 65 or older. The median age was 30 years. For every 100 females, there were 95.1 males. For every 100 females age 18 and over, there were 98.1 males.

The median household income was $50,357 and the median family income  was $54,531. Males had a median income of $38,438 versus $22,083 for females. The per capita income for the town was $17,079. About 3.5% of families and 8.4% of the population were below the poverty line, including 10.3% of those under age 18 and 9.7% of those age 65 or over.

Notable people
Elmer S. Riggs, paleontologist

References

Towns in Johnson County, Indiana
Towns in Indiana
Indianapolis metropolitan area